La Victoria is a town and municipality in the southern Colombian department of Amazonas.

References
Gobernacion del Amazonas, La Victoria

Municipalities of Amazonas Department